The Mitchell Point Tunnel was a tunnel located towards the eastern end of the Historic Columbia River Highway in Oregon, United States. It existed from 1915 to 1966.

History

The tunnel was designed by John Arthur Elliott, who was inspired by a tunnel similarly set into a cliff face above Lake Lucerne in Switzerland. It was built in 1915 and opened late in the year, the first major roadway tunnel in the United States. At the time it was one of the most expensive, if not the most expensive, sections of road ever built.

In 1932, the Toothrock Tunnel was opened, and some traffic was rerouted to the new alignment, though Mitchell Point Tunnel remained open to vehicle traffic until the early 1950s, when the road was rerouted to the base of Mitchell Point. The tunnel was subsequently blocked off with debris, and remained closed until 1966 when it was destroyed as part of Interstate 80N construction.

As part of the rebuilding of the Columbia River Highway into a network of trails, the Oregon Department of Transportation has considered the possibility of boring a new tunnel on Mitchell Point.

Mitchell's Point is named for Captain Mitchell, an early Oregon settler who was said to have jumped from the point to commit suicide, rather than be captured by natives, during a conflict in 1856 later dubbed the Cascades Massacre. In 1921 there were two proposals to change the name to honor heroes of overseas wars.

In 2021 the Oregon Department of Transportation (ODOT) announced commencement of a project to build a replica tunnel in the original location.

See also
List of bridges documented by the Historic American Engineering Record in Oregon
List of tunnels documented by the Historic American Engineering Record in Oregon

References

External links

Vintage Postcards of Mitchell Point Tunnel

Road tunnels in Oregon
Columbia River Gorge
Historic American Engineering Record in Oregon
Historic Columbia River Highway
History of transportation in Oregon
Transportation buildings and structures in Hood River County, Oregon
Tunnels completed in 1915
1915 establishments in Oregon